Geldona Morina (born 8 November 1993) is a Kosovan-born Albanian footballer who plays as a midfielder and has appeared for the Albania women's national team.

Career
Morina has been capped for the Albania national team, appearing for the team during the 2019 FIFA Women's World Cup qualifying cycle.

See also
List of Albania women's international footballers

References

External links
 
 
 

1993 births
Living people
Albanian women's footballers
Women's association football midfielders
MSV Duisburg (women) players
FCR 2001 Duisburg players
SGS Essen players
Frauen-Bundesliga players
Albania women's international footballers
Albanian expatriate footballers
Albanian expatriate sportspeople in Germany
Expatriate women's footballers in Germany
People from Klina
Sportspeople from Peja
Kosovan women's footballers
Kosovan expatriate footballers
Kosovan expatriate sportspeople in Germany
Kosovan people of Albanian descent
Sportspeople of Albanian descent